Blouberg Local Municipality is a municipality  in the Limpopo Province, northern South Africa, bordering Botswana. It takes its name from the Blouberg (literally meaning blue mountain), a mountain range located to the west of the western end of the Soutpansberg mountain range, north west of the town of Vivo. Blouberg is home to some of the most spectacular rock climbing in South Africa. The rock climbing destination is famous for its big wall natural climbing with route lengths up to 350m. The vegetation ranges from sub-tropical savanna at the base, to alpine near the summit.

Demography
According to the 2001 census conducted by Statistics South Africa, the population of the greater Blouberg municipality was 161,314, of whom 99.4% are African, 0.5% white, 0.1% Coloured and 0.1% Asian.

Main places
The 2001 census divided the municipality into the following main places:

Politics 

The municipal council consists of forty-four members elected by mixed-member proportional representation. Twenty-two councillors are elected by first-past-the-post voting in twenty-two wards, while the remaining twenty-two are chosen from party lists so that the total number of party representatives is proportional to the number of votes received. In the election of 1 November 2021 the African National Congress (ANC) won a majority of thirty-three seats on the council.
The following table shows the results of the election.

References

External links
 Blouberg Municipality Website

Local municipalities of the Capricorn District Municipality